Adam David Thompstone (born 4 September 1987) is an English professional rugby union player, most recently for Leicester Tigers in Premiership Rugby, his principle position is wing. Between 2008 and 2012 he played 52 times for London Irish.

Club career 
Thompstone was signed by the London Irish Academy. His debut first-team start was against Worcester Warriors in the EDF Energy Cup in 2008. A serious ankle injury in October 2009 kept him out of the side until January 2011.

Thompstone signed with Leicester Tigers for the 2012–13 season.

Thompstone ended his first season with the Tigers as their top try scorer with 9 in all competitions, including a hat trick on his Premiership debut for the club. He made 22 appearances the following season, scoring 4 tries.

Thompstone made 22 appearances in the 2014/15 season, scoring 5 tries for the club. He started the 2015/16 season making 10 consecutive starts.

In the 2016/17 season, he scored eight tries in thirty games, and was named the Player's Player of the Season

References

1987 births
Living people
English rugby union players
London Irish players
Rugby union wings
Leicester Tigers players
People educated at Whitgift School
Rugby union players from Epsom